"Buckeye Battle Cry", composed by vaudeville performer and songwriter Frank Crumit, is one of two fight songs of the Ohio State Buckeyes, with the other being "(Fight The Team) Across the Field". Every football game in Ohio Stadium begins with Ramp entrance by The Ohio State University Marching Band, performed to "Buckeye Battle Cry". The tradition of Script Ohio ends with the singing of one chorus of the fight song by band members. The song is also played after every Buckeye score.

Planning for the construction of Ohio Stadium resulted in a contest in 1919 to create new school fight songs. Frank Crumit, an alumnus of Ohio University but a Buckeye fan, wrote "Buckeye Battle Cry" and submitted it to the contest.

Some older versions of the lyrics show not COME ON OHIO!, but rather O-HI-O.  While some fans sing O-HI-O (complete with arm motions), the former is more less common.  The Ohio State University Marching Band sings "Come On Ohio" in their rendition. The Marching Band ramp entrance consists of the verse, followed by two repetitions of the chorus.

Lyrics

Sources
OSU Fight Songs
Songs of Ohio State University

American college songs
College fight songs in the United States
Big Ten Conference fight songs
Ohio State University
Ohio State University Spirit and Traditions
1919 songs